The 2020 Libera Awards was held on July 18, 2020 to recognize the best in independent music presented by the American Association of Independent Music. The nominations were announced on April 2, 2020 and the ceremony was streamed online due to the COVID-19 pandemic.

A number of new genre-specific awards were introduced, namely: Best Alternative Rock Album and Best Mainstream Rock Album, succeeding Best Rock Album; Best Folk/Bluegrass Album; and Best Punk/Emo Record.

2020 marked the first year that the award ceremony could be viewed by the public and featured an increased number of musical performances. Performers included Wyclef Jean, Shabazz Palaces, Salt Cathedral, Orville Peck, Y La Bamba, Sudan Archives, Julia Jacklin, Alejandro Escovedo, Suzanne Ciani, Big Thief, and IDLES. The show's livestream was hosted by comedian Chris Gethard with event proceeds going toward the Sweet Relief Musicians Fund.

Winners and nominees

Most nominations 

 Fontaines D.C. – 4
 Flying Lotus – 4
 Orville Peck – 4

Most wins 

 IDLES – 2
 Flying Lotus – 2
 Orville Peck – 2

Special awards 
Independent Icon Award

 Alejandro Escovedo
 Suzanne Ciani
 John Prine

A2IM Lifetime Achievement Award

 Seymour Stein

References

External links 
Official website

2020 music awards
Libera Awards